Walter Hugh Roberts (born 1858) was a Welsh international footballer. He was part of the Wales national football team between 1882 and 1884, playing 6 matches and scoring 1 goal. He played his first match on 13 March 1882 against England and his last match on 29 March 1884 against Scotland.

See also
 List of Wales international footballers (alphabetical)

References

1858 births
Welsh footballers
Wales international footballers
Place of birth missing
Year of death missing
Association football forwards
Ruthin Town F.C. players